This article lists major events during the 2005-06 season in Welsh football.

National team

Wales failed to qualify for the World Cup held in Germany. John Toshack's side had finished 2nd bottom of a group that contained England, Poland, Austria, Northern Ireland, Azerbaijan and themselves. The side only managed to beat Azerbaijan and draw with Northern Ireland.

Welsh Cup

Rhyl beat Bangor City 2–0 in the final of the Welsh Cup.

Welsh League Cup

Total Network Solutions beat Port Talbot Town 4–0 in the final of the Welsh League Cup.

Welsh Premier League

Total Network Solutions won the Welsh Premier League and the full-time professional club met Liverpool in the UEFA Champions League qualifiers in the summer of 2005. TNS lost both legs 3–0. In May 2006 the club changed their name to The New Saints F.C.

Llanelli revealed plans to become only the 2nd full-time side in the League of Wales. Llanelli then finished in their highest ever position in the league of Wales.

 Relegated to Welsh Football League Division One: Cardiff Grange Quins

Welsh Football League Division One

 Champions: Goytre United - did not apply for promotion to Welsh Premier League

Cymru Alliance League

 Champions: Glantraeth - did not apply for promotion to Welsh Premier League

FA Cup
Wembley Stadium closed during rebuilding so the FA Cup was held in Cardiff. The Millennium Stadium hosted the FA Cup finals between 2001 to 2006. Liverpool won the 2001 cup and also won the 2006 cup. From 2007 on the FA Cup was played at the new Wembley stadium.

 
Seasons in Welsh football